Mycobacterium novocastrense is a species of Mycobacterium.

References

External links	
Type strain of Mycobacterium novocastrense at BacDive -  the Bacterial Diversity Metadatabase

novocastrense